In mathematics, specifically in operator theory, each linear operator  on a Euclidean vector space defines a Hermitian adjoint (or adjoint) operator  on that space according to the rule

where  is the inner product on the vector space.

The adjoint may also be called the Hermitian conjugate or simply the Hermitian after Charles Hermite. In finite dimensions where operators are represented by matrices, the Hermitian adjoint is given by the conjugate transpose (also known as the Hermitian transpose).

The above definition of an adjoint operator extends verbatim to bounded linear operators on Hilbert spaces .  The definition has been further extended to include unbounded densely defined operators whose domain is topologically dense in—but not necessarily equal to—

Informal definition 

Consider a linear map  between Hilbert spaces. Without taking care of any details, the adjoint operator is the (in most cases uniquely defined) linear operator  fulfilling 

where  is the inner product in the Hilbert space , which is linear in the first coordinate and antilinear in the second coordinate.

When one trades the inner product for the dual pairing, one can define the adjoint, also called the transpose, of an operator , where  are Banach spaces with corresponding norms .

Note that the above definition in the Hilbert space setting is really just an application of the Banach space case when one identifies a Hilbert space with its dual.

Definition for unbounded operators between Banach spaces 
Let  be Banach spaces. Then its adjoint operator  is defined as follows. The domain is
.

Note that this technicality is necessary to later obtain  as an operator  instead of  Remark also that this does not mean that  can be extended on all of  but the extension only worked for specific elements .

The fundamental defining identity is thus

 for

Definition for bounded operators between Hilbert spaces 
Suppose  is a complex Hilbert space, with inner product . Consider a continuous linear operator  (for linear operators, continuity is equivalent to being a bounded operator).

 

Existence and uniqueness of this operator follows from the Riesz representation theorem.

This can be seen as a generalization of the adjoint matrix of a square matrix which has a similar property involving the standard complex inner product.

Properties 
The following properties of the Hermitian adjoint of bounded operators are immediate:
 Involutivity: 
 Anti-linearity:
 
 , where  denotes the complex conjugate of the complex number 
 "Anti-distributivity": 

then

Moreover,

One says that a norm that satisfies this condition behaves like a "largest value", extrapolating from the case of self-adjoint operators.

The set of bounded linear operators on a complex Hilbert space  together with the adjoint operation and the operator norm form the prototype of a C*-algebra.

Adjoint of densely defined unbounded operators between Hilbert spaces

Definition
Let the inner product  be linear in the first argument. By definition, the domain  of its adjoint  is the set of all  for which there is a  satisfying
 

Properties 1.–5. hold with appropriate clauses about domains and codomains.

ker A=(im A)
For every  the linear functional  is identically zero, and hence 

Conversely, the assumption that  causes the functional  to be identically zero. Since the functional is obviously bounded, the definition of  assures that  The fact that, for every   shows that  given that  is dense.

This property shows that  is a topologically closed subspace even when  is not.

Geometric interpretation

where  and 

Let  be the symplectic mapping, i.e.  Then the graph

The assertion follows from the equivalences

and

Corollaries

A is closed
An operator  is closed if the graph  is topologically closed in  The graph  of the adjoint operator  is the orthogonal complement of a subspace, and therefore is closed.

A is densely defined ⇔ A is closable
An operator  is closable if the topological closure  of the graph  is the graph of a function. Since  is a (closed) linear subspace, the word "function" may be replaced with "linear operator". For the same reason,  is closable if and only if  unless 

The adjoint  is densely defined if and only if  is closable. This follows from the fact that, for every 

which, in turn, is proven through the following chain of equivalencies:

A = A
The closure  of an operator  is the operator whose graph is  if this graph represents a function. As above, the word "function" may be replaced with "operator". Furthermore,  meaning that 

To prove this, observe that  i.e.  for every  Indeed,

In particular, for every  and every subspace   if and only if  Thus,  and  Substituting  obtain

A = (A)
For a closable operator   meaning that  Indeed,

Counterexample where the adjoint is not densely defined
Let  where  is the linear measure. Select a measurable, bounded, non-identically zero function  and pick  Define

It follows that  The subspace  contains all the  functions with compact support. Since   is densely defined. For every  and 

Thus,  The definition of adjoint operator requires that  Since  this is only possible if  For this reason,  Hence,  is not densely defined and is identically zero on  As a result,  is not closable and has no second adjoint

Hermitian operators
A bounded operator  is called Hermitian or self-adjoint if

which is equivalent to

In some sense, these operators play the role of the real numbers (being equal to their own "complex conjugate") and form a real vector space. They serve as the model of real-valued observables in quantum mechanics. See the article on self-adjoint operators for a full treatment.

Adjoints of antilinear operators 
For an antilinear operator the definition of adjoint needs to be adjusted in order to compensate for the complex conjugation. An adjoint operator of the antilinear operator  on a complex Hilbert space  is an antilinear operator  with the property:

Other adjoints 
The equation
 

is formally similar to the defining properties of pairs of adjoint functors in category theory, and this is where adjoint functors got their name from.

See also 

 Mathematical concepts
 Hermitian operator
 Norm (mathematics)
 Transpose of linear maps
 Conjugate transpose
 Physical applications
 Operator (physics)
 †-algebra

References

 .
 .
  

Operator theory